Vyacheslav Tokarev (born 17 June 1986, in Almaty) is a Kazakhstani professional ice hockey player currently playing for Arystan Temirtau in the Kazakhstan Hockey Championship league.

References

External links

Kazakhstani ice hockey forwards
Arystan Temirtau players
1986 births
Living people
Sportspeople from Almaty